Berenice I (c. 340 BC – between 279 and 268 BC) was Queen of Egypt by marriage to Ptolemy I Soter. She became the second queen, after Eurydice, of the Ptolemaic dynasty of Egypt.

Life

Family
Berenice was originally from Eordaea. She was the daughter of princess Antigone of Macedon, and an obscure local, a Macedonian nobleman called Magas.  Her maternal grandfather was a nobleman called Cassander who was the brother of Antipater, the regent for Alexander's empire, and through her mother was a relation to his family.

First marriage
In 325 BC, Berenice married an obscure local nobleman and military officer called Philip.  Philip was previously married and had other children.

Through her first marriage, she became the mother of King Magas of Cyrene, Antigone, who married King Pyrrhus of Epirus; and a daughter called Theoxena.

Magas dedicated an inscription to himself and his father, when he served as a priest of Apollo. Pyrrhus gave her name to a new city called Berenicis.

Philip died around 318 BC.

Queen of Egypt

After the death of her first husband, Berenice travelled to Egypt with her children as a lady-in-waiting for her mother's first cousin Eurydice who was the wife of Ptolemy I. Ptolemy I was one of the generals of King Alexander the Great and founder of the Ptolemaic dynasty of Ancient Egypt.

Berenice became involved in a relationship with Ptolemy I, who married her in 317 BC. Berenice became the mother of Arsinoe II, Philotera, and a son, Ptolemy II Philadelphus.

Her son Ptolemy II was recognized as his father's heir in preference to Eurydice's children to Ptolemy I.

During his reign, Ptolemy II built a port on the Red Sea and named it Berenice after his mother.

After she died, Ptolemy II and later Ptolemy IV Philopator decreed divine honors to her (Theocritus, Idylls xv. and xvii.).

Issue
With her first spouse Philip, she became the mother of:
 King Magas of Cyrene
 Antigone, who married King Pyrrhus of Epirus
 Theoxena
With her second spouse Ptolemy I, she became the mother of:
 Arsinoe II, who married first Lysimachus, then her half-brother Ptolemy Keraunos and finally her full brother Ptolemy II.
 Philotera c.312-c.275 BC, deified.
 Ptolemy II Philadelphus, Pharaoh of Egypt.

References

Further reading

4th-century BC Pharaohs
3rd-century BC Pharaohs
Queens consort of the Ptolemaic dynasty
3rd-century BC Egyptian people
4th-century BC Egyptian women
3rd-century BC Egyptian women
Female pharaohs
Ancient Greek sportspeople
Sportswomen in antiquity
3rd-century BC women rulers
Ancient Eordaeans